Ordinary magisterium may refer to:

 A category of officials in the Roman Republic.  See Magistratus.
 The bishops of the Catholic Church in their role as teachers.  When the bishops teach something with unanimity, they are referred to as the ordinary and universal magisterium; see Infallibility of the Church, and Magisterium.

See also 

 Extraordinary magisterium (disambiguation)